Hyposmocoma kaikuono is a species of moth of the family Cosmopterigidae. It is endemic to Molokai. The type locality is Honouli, Malo’o Bay.

The wingspan is 10.1–13.2 mm.

Adults were reared from case-making larvae collected on rocks covered with lichen at sea level. Larvae were reared on fish food and carrots.

External links
Three new species of Hyposmocoma (Lepidoptera, Cosmopterigidae) from the Hawaiian Islands, based on morphological and molecular evidence

K
Endemic moths of Hawaii
Biota of Molokai
Moths described in 2008